Video games are electronic games that involve interaction with a user interface.

Video Games may also refer to:

 Video Games: The Movie, a 2014 documentary film by Jeremy Snead
 VideoGames & Computer Entertainment, later VideoGames - The Ultimate Gaming Magazine, a defunct American periodical
 "Video Games" (song), by Lana Del Rey, 2011
 "Video Game" (song), by Sufjan Stevens, 2020
 "Video Games", a 1980 song by Ronnie Jones

See also
 Video Games Live, a concert series created by Tommy Tallarico